Versions of the Truth is the thirteenth studio album by British progressive rock band The Pineapple Thief, released on 4 September 2020 through Kscope. it is the third album to include Gavin Harrison on drums.

Track listing

Alternate album

Charts

References 

2020 albums
The Pineapple Thief albums